The Rough Guide to Flamenco is a world music compilation album originally released in 1997. Part of the World Music Network Rough Guides series, the album gives broad coverage to the flamenco genre of Spain. The compilation was produced by Phil Stanton, co-founder of the World Music Network. Liner notes were written by Tom Andrews. This was the first of three similarly named albums: the second was released in 2007; the third, in 2013.

Critical reception

The Album received mixed reviews. Writing for AllMusic, Adam Greenberg called it a "nice overview of the tradition", but that for purer forms, listeners should "look elsewhere". Michaelangelo Matos of the Chicago Reader claimed it "suffered from compilationitis", losing steam half way through.

Track listing

References 

1997 compilation albums
World Music Network Rough Guide albums